Stoke Park Ward is a ward in the South West Area of Ipswich, Suffolk, England. It returns three councillors to Ipswich Borough Council.

It is designated Middle Layer Super Output Area Ipswich 015 by the Office of National Statistics. It is composed of 5 Lower Layer Super Output Areas.

Ward profile, 2008
Stoke Park Ward is located to the south of central Ipswich. In 2005 it had a population of about 7,100. In many ways it is quite representative of Ipswich as a whole .

References

Wards of Ipswich